Water Womb World is a 2020 adventure and horror video game developed by Yames. The game was self-published and released on Itch.io on 16 June 2020 under a pay what you want model.

Gameplay 
Water Womb World is a short game, taking about 15 minutes to complete, and largely revolves around collecting and examining various specimens and samples underwater, acquired through catching local wildlife and through sifting through the silt of the seabed. The game uses an intentionally grainy graphical style. The player moves out of the submarine craft to collect samples, returns to analyze what was collected, and then ventures out again. The game places a higher focus on atmosphere than gameplay and mechanics.

Plot 
Water Womb World follows an unnamed marine scientist and professor as he travels to the bottom of the ocean in a region known as "Gasper's Zone" with the goal of finding the location of the Garden of Eden and perhaps also God and divine enlightenment. Over the course of the game, the truth is slowly and gradually unfolded, introducing more theological aspects and driving the protagonist more and more insane, culminating in a biological transformation.

Development and themes 
Water Womb World was created by Yames out of a desire to make something that was different from their previous point-and-click horror game, Discover My Body. They had also for a long period of time wanted to create a horror game set underwater; initially the idea was to have 2D swimming simulation in the game but this was scrapped since it was too labor-intensive. The gameplay of Water Womb World was inspired by first-person point-and-click adventure games Yames played in their youth.

Initially the game did not have any religious elements, which were instead incorporated while Yames was writing the dialogue text. The idea of mixing horror with religion was something Yames had wanted to explore for some time. Yames described the final game as "aqua Catholicism" and stated in a 2020 interview that the inspiration of its underwater setting came from the idea of the oceanic feeling, a concept coined by Romain Rolland in 1927 as "a sensation of 'eternity'", a feeling of "being one with the external world as a whole". The protagonist of Water Womb World was initially intended to be an entirely secular scientist who over the course of the game had their knowledge of the underwater world replaced by a more theological understanding. For the final game, Yames altered the character to also be religious, but to have a "very strange interpretation of their religion" and to wish to prove their Biblical interpretation to the rest of the world.

Water Womb World was created over the course of a few days while Yames was visiting their family. The game was released on Itch.io for Microsoft Windows on 16 June 2020 and for macOS on 8 December 2020. Water Womb World's original soundtrack was released for free on 22 June 2020. The soundtrack included all of the music from the game as well as two tracks that were cut before release.

Reception 
Water Womb World is typically regarded as an "unnerving" experience. Christian Meffert of Game Rant counted Water Womb World in 2021 as among the best horror games under an hour, praising its "psychadelic mix of Lovecraftian cosmic horror and religious fanaticism" and that the game's "retro-style 2D graphics helps place the game just under realism, making the player question what it is they are seeing".

References 

2020 video games
Indie video games
2020s horror video games
Single-player video games